Max Alsberg (16 October 1877 – 11 September 1933) was a famous criminal lawyer of the Weimar Republic.

Alsberg worked primarily as a criminal defense lawyer; he defended Karl Helfferich in 1920 and Carl von Ossietzky in 1931. He also wrote plays (Voruntersuchung in 1927, and Konflikt). His best known contribution to legal science is the handbook Der Beweisantrag im Strafprozess.

Max Alsberg committed suicide by gunshot on 11 September 1933.

References

20th-century German lawyers
People of the Weimar Republic
Jewish emigrants from Nazi Germany to Switzerland
Ludwig Maximilian University of Munich alumni
Humboldt University of Berlin alumni
Leipzig University alumni
1877 births
1933 suicides
Suicides by firearm in Switzerland
Jurists from North Rhine-Westphalia
1933 deaths